The 1996–97 Combined Counties Football League season was the 19th in the history of the Combined Counties Football League, a football competition in England.

The league was won by Ashford Town (Middlesex) for the third time in succession.

League table

The league was reduced from 22 clubs to 20 after D.C.A. Basingstoke, Eton Wick and Peppard joined the Chiltonian League, and Horley Town joined the Crawley and District League. Two new clubs joined:

Corinthian-Casuals, transferred from the Spartan League
Cove, resigned from the Isthmian League

References

External links
 Combined Counties League Official Site

1996-97
1996–97 in English football leagues